The Tasmania JackJumpers are an Australian professional basketball team based in Hobart, Tasmania, who entered the National Basketball League (NBL) in the 2021–22 season, and play their home games at MyState Bank Arena and the Silverdome. The team is named after the Jack Jumper Ant, a species of venomous ant predominantly found in the island state.

Franchise history
In February 2019, the National Basketball League (NBL) indicated that Tasmania was on the league's future expansion radar. Twelve months later, it was revealed that Tasmania had secured an NBL license and a team would enter the league in the 2021–22 season.

On 1 October 2020, the team name was revealed as the Tasmania JackJumpers. On the eve of the team's first NBL game, Tasmanian band Luca Brasi released "Jackies Are On the March", an original theme for the team.

In their NBL debut on 3 December 2021, the JackJumpers defeated the Brisbane Bullets 83–74 in overtime at MyState Bank Arena in Hobart. The JackJumpers finished the regular season in fourth place with a 17–11 record and faced the first-placed Melbourne United in the semi-finals, where they defeated United 2–1 to advance to the NBL Grand Final series. They ultimately lost 3–0 in the grand final to the Sydney Kings.

Home arena
The JackJumpers are headquartered, train, and play most of their home games at MyState Bank Arena, located in Glenorchy, part of the metropolitan Hobart region. The Silverdome, located in Launceston, also hosts a minimum of two home games a year.

Current roster

Honour roll

Season by season

References

External links 

 

 
Sporting clubs in Tasmania
National Basketball League (Australia) teams
Basketball teams in Tasmania
2020 establishments in Australia
Basketball teams established in 2020